Macrodiprion is a genus of sawflies belonging to the family Diprionidae.

The species of this genus are found in Europe.

Species:
 Macrodiprion nemoralis (Enslin, 1917

References

Diprionidae
Sawfly genera